Nabiul Islam Nayeem is a Bangladeshi cricketer. He made his first-class debut for Dhaka Metropolis in the 2017–18 National Cricket League on 15 September 2017.

References

External links
 

Year of birth missing (living people)
Living people
Bangladeshi cricketers
Place of birth missing (living people)
Dhaka Metropolis cricketers